is a 2011 Japanese film directed by Shusuke Kaneko.

Cast
 Atsushi Arai as Eiri Kaido 
 Masahiro Inoue
 Minehiro Kinomoto 
 Sho Jinnai

References

External links
  
 

Films directed by Shusuke Kaneko
2011 films
2010s Japanese films